Craigie railway station served from 1838 to 1839 as the temporary terminus, of the Dundee end of the Dundee and Arbroath Railway.

History 
The station opened on 6 October 1838 by the Dundee and Arbroath Railway. It was, at the time the southern terminus of the newly opened the line, south of  station.

References

External links 

Disused railway stations in Dundee
Railway stations in Great Britain opened in 1838
Railway stations in Great Britain closed in 1839
1838 establishments in Scotland
1839 disestablishments in Scotland
Former Dundee and Arbroath Railway stations